Privett is a small village and conservation area in the East Hampshire district of Hampshire, England. It is in the civil parish of Froxfield and Privett. Its principal feature is Holy Trinity Church, designed by Arthur Blomfield and built at the expense of local landowner, businessman and M.P. William Nicholson. Nicholson was also responsible for building in the village a number of residences for workers on his Basing Park estate.

History
A place called Pryfetesflōd (Privett's River), located in the Weald, is mentioned in the 755 AD entry of the Anglo-Saxon Chronicle (the story of Cynewulf and Cyneheard), as the place where Sigeberht of Wessex, previously a ruler of Hampshire, was driven off to.

The village was known as Pryvet in the 14th century and Pryvate in the 16th century. The parish of Holy Trinity is listed as being part of the parish and manor of West Meon in 1391, belonging to St. Swithun's Monastery, later granted to the Dean and Chapter of Winchester by Henry the Eighth.

Between 1903 and 1955 the village was served by Privett railway station on the Meon Valley Railway, which was situated half a mile (1 km) west of the village itself.

Governance
The village of Privett is part of the civil parish of Froxfield and Privett, to which it was added in 1932. It is part of the Froxfield and Steep ward of the East Hampshire District Council, which is a Non-metropolitan district of Hampshire County Council.

Transport
Hampshire Bus provide a daily service to and from Alton College on school days.

Gallery

References

Villages in Hampshire